The Chronicles of Narnia: Prince Caspian (An Original Walt Disney Records Soundtrack) is the soundtrack to the film The Chronicles of Narnia: Prince Caspian. Harry Gregson-Williams composed the soundtrack, which was released on May 13, 2008 in the United States by Walt Disney Records.

It has been praised by critics for being "darker" and "more grown up" than the previous soundtrack, but criticized for reusing many of the themes from the first film.

Track listing 
All songs performed by Harry Gregson-Williams except where noted.

 Both "The Call" and "This Is Home" appear in the movie slightly altered in lyrics and music making them different from the soundtrack version.
 "Lucy" did not appear in the theatrical version. However, it makes its full appearance on the DVD.

Musicians 
 Composed and conducted by Harry Gregson-Williams
 Additional music by Stephen Barton, Halli Cauthery and David Buckley
 Percussion programming by Hybrid
 Orchestra contracted by Isobel Griffiths
 Concertmaster: Perry Montague-Mason
 Choir performed by The Bach Choir, Apollo Voices and the Crouch End Festival Chorus

Charts

Awards 
In 2009, the album won a Dove Award for Special Event Album of the Year at the 40th GMA Dove Awards.

Notes

External links 
 The Chronicles of Narnia: Prince Caspian Soundtrack - Amazon
 Soundtrack Review at Tracksounds

Disney film soundtracks
The Chronicles of Narnia music
2008 soundtrack albums
Walt Disney Records soundtracks
Harry Gregson-Williams soundtracks
The Chronicles of Narnia (film series)
Fantasy film soundtracks